The 1910 South Carolina Gamecocks football team represented the University of South Carolina as an independent during the 1910 college football season. Led by first-year head coach John Neff, South Carolina compiled a record of 4–4.

Schedule

References

South Carolina
South Carolina Gamecocks football seasons
South Carolina Gamecocks football